Alonso Quijano (spelled Quixano in English and in the Spanish of Cervantes' day) is the personal name of the famous fictional hidalgo (lowest nobility caste) who is better known as Don Quijote, a name he invents after either falling into or feigning insanity. Alonso Quijano/Don Quijote is the leading character of the 1605/1615 novel Don Quijote de la Mancha, written by Miguel de Cervantes.

At the outset of the work (Chapter 1 of Part I) we are informed that there is confusion about what his name is. Some (imaginary) authors, the text says, disagree about whether his name was Quijada ("jaw") or Quesada, although by reasoning ("conjeturas verosímiles") one could arrive at the name Quijana. At this point, Quijano is not even mentioned as a possibility, nor is Alonso, hinting the reader into one of the most notable yet purposefully obfuscated examples of an unreliable narrator. In Chapter 49 of Part I he tells us that he was a direct descendant of Gutierre Quijada. His "real" name of Alonso Quijano is only revealed (invented) in the last chapter of Part II, and with the stated purpose of demonstrating the falseness of the spurious Part II of the pseudonymous Alonso Fernández de Avellaneda, in which work the protagonist is Martín Quijada.

Knights in the chivalric books Alonso Quijano read, which reading caused his madness, have nicknames. In Chapter 19 of Part I his squire Sancho Panza invents his first nickname, the hard-to-translate "Caballero de la Triste Figura": knight of miserable (triste) appearance (figura). Sancho explains its meaning: Don Quijote is the worst-looking man he has ever seen, thin from hunger and missing most of his teeth. After an encounter with lions, Don Quijote himself invents his second nickname, "Knight of the Lions", in Part II, Chapter 17.  Both titles reference famous knights: Ysaie le Triste, the son of Tristan and Iseult, and Yvain, the Knight of the Lion.

Literary characters introduced in 1605
Don Quixote characters
Fictional Spanish people
Fictional knights
Male characters in literature